Souring is a food preparation technique that causes a physical and chemical change in food by exposing it to an acid. This acid can be added explicitly (e.g., vinegar, lemon juice, lime juice, etc.), or can be produced within the food itself by a microbe, such as Lactobacillus.

Souring is similar to pickling or fermentation, but souring typically occurs in minutes or hours, while pickling and fermentation can take a much longer amount of time.

Examples

Dairy products produced by souring include:
Clabber,
Cheese,
Crème fraîche,
Cultured buttermilk,
Curd,
Filmjölk,
Kefir,
Paneer,
Smetana,
Soured milk,
Sour cream, and
Yogurt.

Grain products include:
Idli,
Sourdough, and
Sour mash.

Others foods produced by souring include:
Ceviche, Kinilaw, and 
Key lime pie.

See also
 Fermented milk products
 Food preservation
 Marination

References

External links
 Buttermilk substitution
 Free lactic acid in sour milk
 A comparison of sourdough microflora
 Cultured milk products

Cooking techniques
Fermentation in food processing
Culinary terminology